Deh Fish (also Romanized as Deh Fīsh) is a village in Deh Fish Rural District, Banaruiyeh District, Larestan County, Fars Province, Iran. At the 2006 census, its population was 1,317, in 295 families.

References 

Populated places in Larestan County